Piers Bohl (23 October 1865 – 25 December 1921) was a Latvian mathematician, who worked in differential equations, topology and quasi-periodic functions.

He was born in 1865 in Walk, Livonia, in the family of a poor Baltic German merchant. In 1884, after graduating from a German school in Viljandi, he entered the faculty of physics and mathematics at the University of Tartu. In 1893 Bohl was awarded his Master's degree. This was for an investigation of quasi-periodic functions. The notion of quasi-periodic functions was generalised still further by Harald Bohr when he introduced almost-periodic functions. He has been the first to prove the three-dimensional case of the Brouwer fixed-point theorem, but his work was not noticed at the time.

References

External links
 
 Bohl biography at www-history.mcs.st-and.ac.uk
 http://www.mathematics.lv/lms_10_years_after.pdf

1865 births
1921 deaths
People from Valka
People from Kreis Walk
Baltic-German people
Latvian mathematicians
University of Tartu alumni
Academic staff of Riga Technical University